Elections were held in the state of Western Australia on 4 February 1989 to elect all 57 members to the Legislative Assembly and all 34 members to the Legislative Council. The Labor government, led by Premier Peter Dowding, won a third term in office against the Liberal Party, led by Opposition Leader Barry MacKinnon.

The result was a major swing against the Labor Party, coming in the wake of revelations of dealings between Government and business that came to be known as WA Inc. The redistribution that took place in 1988, based upon the Acts Amendment (Electoral Reform) Act 1987 which abolished several country and outer metropolitan electorates while creating new metropolitan ones, makes it difficult to assess how Labor would have performed on the old boundaries—while it lost four seats, it gained one Liberal-held seat and won several of the new seats, so in net terms, it only lost one seat despite the massive swing and the low two-party-preferred result.

This was the first election in WA contested by the Australian Greens Party.

Results

Legislative Assembly

|}

Legislative Council

|}

Seats changing parties

 A redistribution prior to the election had made the Labor-held seat of Warren notionally Liberal
 Members listed in italics did not contest their seat at this election.
 * figure is vs. National
 ** figure is vs. Labor
 *** figure is vs. Liberal

Post-election pendulum

See also
 Candidates of the 1989 Western Australian state election
 Members of the Western Australian Legislative Assembly, 1986–1989
 Members of the Western Australian Legislative Assembly, 1989–1993

References

Elections in Western Australia
1989 elections in Australia
1980s in Western Australia
February 1989 events in Australia